The FIL World Luge Championships 1991 took place in Winterberg, Germany for the second time, having previously hosted the event in 1989. It also marked the first time East Germany and West Germany competed as a unified German team.

Men's singles

Women's singles

Erdmann becomes the first champion of a unified German team, leading the nation to a medal sweep in the event.

Men's doubles

Mixed team

Medal table

References
Men's doubles World Champions
Men's singles World Champions
Mixed teams World Champions
Women's singles World Champions

FIL World Luge Championships
1991 in luge
1991 in German sport
Luge in Germany